Ray Robertson (December 7, 1901 – June 18, 1937) was an American sprinter. He competed in the men's 400 metres at the 1924 Summer Olympics.

References

External links
 

1901 births
1937 deaths
Athletes (track and field) at the 1924 Summer Olympics
American male sprinters
Olympic track and field athletes of the United States